Tartak Lock is the thirteenth lock on the Augustow Canal (from the Biebrza). It was not planned in the original draft written by Ignatius Prądzyński. Its construction was necessary because the state of the waters piled high water, and destroyed hydro-technical equipment.

Built between 1837 - 1838 by Eng. Jakub Szeffer.
 Location: 74.4 km channel
 Level difference: 1.72 m
 Length: 45.35 m
 Width: 6.08 m
 Gates: Wooden
 Year built: 1837 - 1838
 Construction Manager: Jakub Szeffer

References

 
 
 

19th-century establishments in Poland
Tartak
Augustów County